Sookshm Information Services PVT LTD (formerly Sukshm Information Services) is a rural or non-urban BPO in India. The organisation provides employment and training to youths in rural areas. Its clients are some of the biggest online companies in India. It contributes directly to the bottom line of the clients by providing services from tier 2 and tier 3 cities and passing on the chunk of savings to clients.

Mentioned in the leading media of the country for its disruptive business model, The Economic Times mentioned it under the head "India Inc's Pursuit of Innovators" and was termed as "India's New Change Makers" in a 'Focus' report by Hindustan Times. The organisation achieves dual objectives of bringing prosperity to hinterland and cost savings to corporate.

Recognized by the Mahindra Group and IIT, Delhi for social impact and contribution to the society.

References

 www.sookshm.com
 Award by Mahindra Group
 The Economic Times Coverage
 Hindustan Times Coverage

Employment in India